This is a list of electoral results for the electoral district of Murray-Wellington in Western Australian state elections.

Members for Murray-Wellington

Election results

Elections in the 2020s

Elections in the 2010s

Elections in the 2000s

Elections in the 1990s

Elections in the 1980s

Note: 1988 redistribution made the seat notionally Labor held based on 1986 results.

Elections in the 1970s

Elections in the 1960s 

 Fred Crockenberg contested the 1962 election as an Independent and the swing is shown against his margin from that election.

Elections in the 1950s

Elections in the 1940s

Elections in the 1930s

Elections in the 1920s 

 Preferences were not distributed.

Elections in the 1910s

Elections in the 1900s

Elections in the 1890s

References

Western Australian state electoral results by district